David Jones  (born 28 October 1910) was a Welsh footballer who played as a defender. He was part of the Wales national team between 1933 and 1937 playing seven matches. He played his first match on 4 November 1933 against Ireland and his last match on 17 March 1937 against Ireland.

See also
 List of Wales international footballers (alphabetical)

References

1910 births
Association football defenders
Welsh footballers
Wales international footballers
Date of death missing
Leicester City F.C. players